The men's kumite 60 kg competition in karate at the 2017 World Games took place on 25 July 2017 at the GEM Sports Complex in Wrocław, Poland.

Results

Elimination round

Group A

Group B

Finals
{{#invoke:RoundN|N4
|widescore=yes|bold_winner=high|team-width=200
|RD1=Semifinals
|3rdplace=yes

|||0||5
|||0||7

|||4||2

|||1|

References

Karate at the 2017 World Games
2017 World Games